Tim Hutten (born June 4, 1985) is an American water polo player. He is a member of the United States men's national water polo team at the 2008 Beijing Olympics. In the championship game, the USA team won the silver medal, losing to Hungary. He also competed at the 2012 Summer Olympics.

Hutten played college water polo at the University of California, Irvine where he was a Cutino Award winner in 2008, and is a 2003 graduate of Los Alamitos High School.

See also
 List of Olympic medalists in water polo (men)

References

External links
 

1985 births
Living people
American male water polo players
Water polo centre backs
UC Irvine Anteaters men's water polo players
Water polo players at the 2008 Summer Olympics
Water polo players at the 2012 Summer Olympics
Medalists at the 2008 Summer Olympics
Olympic silver medalists for the United States in water polo
Water polo players at the 2011 Pan American Games
Pan American Games medalists in water polo
Pan American Games gold medalists for the United States
Medalists at the 2011 Pan American Games